Xcalibur is a CGI sword-and-sorcery children's television series that aired on YTV from 1 September  2001 to 1 April 2002.

The series is produced using Alias Wavefront Maya 3D software.

Premise
King Edwin, ruler of a medieval-like Kingdom is assassinated by his brother and regent, Bragan, who has made a truce with the evil warlock, Kwodahn. The murder is witnessed by Prince Erwann who carries out the dying King's final orders; to take Xcalibur and hide it in a safe place. After hiding the sword, Kwodahn curses Erwann, turning him to stone. Erwann's feisty teenage daughter, Princess Djana befriends Herik, a young apprentice of the exiled Shogis, a sect of sorcerers, who has been entrusted with the Book of Life, the collected knowledge of the Shogis. Together, they retrieve Xcalibur, however upon reaching the Royal Palace, they learn Bragan has taken control of the Kingdom as regent to Arthus, the 10-year-old sovereign, too young to rule himself, and confiscated Prince Erwann's lands as his own, falsely branding him as the assassin.

Unable to convince the lords or Arthus that Bragan is a traitor, Djana goes on the run with Herik, Tara - a member of the People of the Sea, often referred to as Barbarians - and Wip, a small dragon, and are branded outlaws by Bragan. Djana's resistance to Bragan's alliance with Kwodahn sparks a rebellion in the kingdom, assisted by the people of the villages of Mallory and Quinn, and (later), secretly assisted by Prince Duncan, one of the lords of the Kingdom.

Characters
 Princess Djana — the fiery daughter of Prince Erwann, strongly opposed to Kwodahn and Prince Bragan. Her mother mysteriously disappeared, leaving Djana alone. She takes the sword Xcalibur to protect the innocent and to free her father from the curse it hinted at that Djana is bisexual for her feelings for Tara and Herik 
 Herik — a young Shogi apprentice, rebellious by nature. During Bragan's attack on the Shogi Monastery, he is entrusted with the Book of Life by the Grand Magus. He befriends Djana and helps her to retrieve Xcalibur, going on the run with her.
 Tara — a young dark skin messenger sent by the People of the Sea. She is sent to negotiate with Prince Erwann, who was the go-between for negotiating a peace treaty between King Edwin and her people; peace in exchange for a place to settle in the kingdom. She arrives too late, and is declared an outlaw along with Djana and Herik where it implied in the episode The Toll Of The Past Djana and Tara have feelings for each other.
 Wip — a small flying dragon (with four legs) who was once the Totem of Sapphire.
 Prince Bragan — King Edwin's younger brother, who has him assassinated. He is in league with Kwodahn, and attempts to subvert his nephew Arthus to become king.
 King Arthus — the 10 year old sovereign, son of the late King Edwin. He is naive, easily led by his uncle, Bragan who believes his story that Erwann assassinated the King to steal Xcalibur.
 Kwodahn — the Devil, who lives in a flying castle. He carries out his plans for domination through Bragan and Walka, who have sold their souls to him.
 Wolf — the leader of the People of the Sea, raiders who attack the Kingdom for food and riches. King Edwin attempted to negotiate with them, offering them a land to settle in return for peace, however his assassination prevents this from happening. He eventually discovers that Herik is his son.
 Walka — one of the three Sylph sisters in Brocelianda, dressed in a green gown, the Sylph of the Appearances who leans towards serving Kwodahn, has become an evil sorceress. She is banished from the Sylphs by Fedora, who turns into a Medusa-like creature. As a Sylph, she possesses a jewel: Sylph Bracelet. She eventually redeems herself by freeing Queen Lorna, and defying Kwodahn. Her Totem is a Two-Headed Snake. She is the Aunt of Djana and godmother of Queen Lorna.
 Fedora — one of the three Sylph sisters in Brocelianda. Sylph of Time and Queen of the Sylphs, dressed in a blue gown. She possesses a jewel: Sylph Necklace, and a wand. Her Totem is a Unicorn. She is the Aunt of Djana.
 Sapphire — one of the three Sylph sisters in Brocelianda, dressed in a red gown, the Sylph of the Expressions and Djana's mother. She possesses a jewel: Sylph Ring. Her Totem is Wip. She is the mother of Djana and wife of Erwann.
 Mussi — governess to King Arthus. She is devoted to the care of Arthus.
 Queen Lorna — King Arthus' mother and rightful regent of the Kingdom. Bragan decided to get rid of Lorna first, and gave the task of assassinating her to her godmother; Walka. Unable to kill her goddaughter, she hid Lorna in Mussi's body. She is eventually released by Walka in a bout of redemption, and replaces Bragan as the regent.
 Prince Erwann — Princess Djana's father. He was Chief of King Edwin's Army and his close friend, who worked as a bridge between Edwin and Tara, representing the People of the Sea. It is implied he had a relationship of sorts with Tara. He is cursed by Kwodahn and turned to stone when he refuses to hand over Xcalibur to him.
 King Edwin — the late ruler of the Kingdom and Arthus' father. He is portrayed as a just and fair ruler, who wanted to make peace with the People of the Sea.
 Zeky Zek — Wolf's subordinate.
 Zoldan — a Shaman who accompanies the People of the Sea. He is often used as a pawn by Kwodahn for his plans.
 Morgan — an experienced Shogi who leads the exiled Shogis to a new life on the Shogi Island. He is a close friend of Herik.
 The Shogi Master — sometimes called the Grand Magus, a powerful sorcerer and leader of the Shogis.
 Silkar — a citizen of the village of Mallory, and one of Djana's allies. He eventually becomes a prominent figure in the rebellion against Bragan.
 Arped — a citizen of the hamlet of Quinn, and another prominent figure in the resistance against Bragan.
 Will — one of the leaders of the Wandering City, a city which floats above the sea, inhabited by pacifists.
 Erin — one of the inhabitants of Quinn. She is initially a spy for Bragan, passing on information about the rebellion's plans to attack Bragan's camp and kill him. However, she redeems herself and becomes a close friend of Djana.
 Prince Duncan — also known as the Green Prince. He becomes Djana's most powerful and trusted ally within the Council after she helps to save his lands from Kwodahn's magic. He is strongly opposed to Bragan's plans.
 The Red Prince — one of the lords of the Kingdom. He is Bragan's closest ally on the council.
 The Yellow Prince — another of the Kingdom's lords.

Voices
Joanna Ruiz Rodriguez as Princess Djana / King Arthus 
Ben Small as Herik 
Jules de Jongh as Tara 
Tom Clarke-Hill as Kwodahn / Wip 
Regine Candler as Walka / Mussi 
Tom Eastwood as Prince Bragan 
Andy Turvey as King Edwyn / Zoldan 
Eric Meyers as Wolf / Prince Erwann

Episode list
The following is a full list of episodes in the order they are presented on DVD. Some of the episodes are not in their correct chronological order.

DVD availability
Anchor Bay released the series on DVD in the UK on 15 November 2004 in the form of a ten-disc box set with four episodes per disc. The set contains an episode guide on the packaging but no other extras. It has a listed running time of 16 hours.

Anchor Bay's release features an error in the ordering of episodes, meaning that the correct chronological order has not been maintained. This particularly applies to the episodes The Secret of the Sylphs (episode 25) and The Return (episode 26), which should in fact  immediately precede Love and Duty (episode 37).

External links
Episode Guide

2000s Canadian animated television series
2001 Canadian television series debuts
2002 Canadian television series endings
2000s French animated television series
2001 French television series debuts
2002 French television series endings
Canadian computer-animated television series
French computer-animated television series
YTV (Canadian TV channel) original programming
Canadian children's animated fantasy television series
French children's animated fantasy television series
Canal+ original programming
Occitan-language mass media
Television shows set in Occitania
English-language television shows
Sylphs